The number of women sitting in the House of Commons decreased to two during the 23rd Canadian Parliament; the number of women senators remained at five. 29 women ran for seats in the Canadian House of Commons in the 1957 federal election.

In 1957, Ellen Fairclough became the first woman to serve as a member of the Canadian cabinet.

Party Standings

Members of the House of Commons

Senators

References 

Lists of women politicians in Canada